Tommy Boy Entertainment is an American independent record label and multimedia brand founded in 1981 by Tom Silverman. The label is credited with helping and launching the music careers of Queen Latifah, Afrika Bambaataa, Stetsasonic, Digital Underground, Coolio, De La Soul, House of Pain, Naughty By Nature, and Force MDs. Tommy Boy is also credited with introducing genres such as EDM, Latin freestyle, and Latin hip hop to mainstream audiences in America.

History

1981-1985: Independent music media
Tom Silverman created Tommy Boy Music in 1981 in his New York City apartment with a $5,000 loan from his parents. The label was an outgrowth of Silverman's Dance Music Report bi-weekly publication, which spanned 14 years, beginning in September 1978.

1985–2002: Partnership with Warner Bros. Records
In 1985, Warner Bros. Records entered into a partnership with Tommy Boy and acquired half of the label, and it allowed the label to use independent distribution as it saw fit, with the option to distribute artists through the major-label channel through Warner Bros. Records or sister label Reprise Records.

Monica Lynch, who was one of the first employees hired by Tom Silverman, became president of the label in 1985. As A&R for the label, she signed and managed Queen Latifah, De La Soul, and host of hip hop musicians. Even though the male–female power struggle in hip hop music has always been present, Lynch and her peers said that the early days of hip hop were magical times for women looking to make it in the record business. Julie Greenwald, Sylvia Robinson, DJ Jazzy Joyce, Mona Scott, and Claudine Joseph also made their mark on different areas of hip-hop. Greenwald and Robinson, like Lynch, became powerful music executives. For more than 25 years, DJ Jazzy Joyce has been one of the most visible and in-demand female turntablists. And Scott and Joseph have managed the careers of some of the biggest names in hip-hop. "Hip-hop provided a tremendous amount of opportunities for women, which might seem antithetical because of the association that many people have with misogyny and hip-hop," says Lynch. "There has been a lot of attention paid to misogynist lyrics in hip-hop over the years, and I'm not going to defend or damn it. I think it exists, but some of the people who helped put those records out were women."According to Jeff "Chairman" Mao, a key DJ in 1990s underground hip-hop and online hip-hop radio host, Monica Lynch managed the careers of Afrika Bambaataa & Soulsonic Force, Stetsasonic, Queen Latifah, De La Soul, Naughty by Nature among others.

The label had several joint ventures in the mid 1990s including Penalty Recordings, Stepsun, Beyond, and Ignition. The label also had deals with labels such as Timber Records and distribution deals with Outcaste Records and 75 Ark, while also giving independent distribution to sister imprints that already had label deals with WEA, including American Recordings' Ill Labels, Mute Records' NovaMute, and Cold Chillin Records' Livin' Large.

In 1997, Tommy Boy launched an imprint label called Upaya to pursue the growing interest in spirituality and spiritual/world music. The imprint Tommy Boy Gospel was launched in 1998 under the direction of Max Seigel and Marvie Wright. That same year, the imprints Tommy Boy Black Label, which specialized in underground hip hop music, and Tommy Boy Silver Label, which specialized in dance music, were founded.

In 2001, while still affiliated with Warner Music, Tommy Boy Records founder Tom Silverman formed Tommy Boy Films, a TV and film division with Kung Faux creator and Dubtitled Entertainment founder, Michael "Mic" Neumann.

2002–2017: Independent again
In 2002, Tommy Boy Records became independent again after it ultimately ended its joint venture with Warner Bros. Records, which wanted greater unit sales, and the master tapes released until that time became property of Warner Music, while the Tommy Boy trademark remained with Tom Silverman. The then-current Tommy Boy music artists were shopped to the various WEA labels, the Tommy Boy television and film divisions were merged with the Tommy Boy music division, and the resulting company was rebranded as Tommy Boy Entertainment. Tommy Boy then began licensing its trademark to Warner Music for use on reissues through Rhino/Atlantic Records.

2017–2018: Catalogues acquired
In 2017, because of Warner Music's divestment requirements as a result of its purchase of Parlophone, Tommy Boy was able to reacquire its pre-2002 catalogue and the catalogues of Brand Nubian, Grand Puba, and Club Nouveau. In 2018, Tommy Boy also acquired Amherst Records, Harlem Music, and Halwill Music, which hold masters and publishing rights for a diverse collection of ’70s Soul, Disco, and Jazz artists including The Stylistics, Van McCoy, and Glenn Medeiros.

2019–2020: De La Soul controversy
Controversy rose in early 2019, after Tommy Boy announced that the catalog of its formerly signed group De La Soul would be available on streaming services later that week. This announcement prompted the group to begin a "Tommy Boycott" campaign, due to the fact that they would receive only 10% of revenue generated by streams, with the other 90% going to Tommy Boy. The campaign was shared by their fellow artists Nas, Questlove and Pete Rock, among others. In response, Tommy Boy postponed the deal and announced their discography would not be available on streaming services as previously scheduled.

2021–present: Tommy Boy sold to Reservoir Media
In June 2021, Tommy Boy was acquired for $100 million by Reservoir Media, a music publishing and media rights company founded in 2007 by Iranian-Canadian businesswoman Golnar Khosrowshahi.

Brand image
The Tommy Boy logo was originally designed in 1982 by Steven Miglio and redesigned in 1989 by Eric Haze. The logo was named on Complex's list of the 50 Greatest Rap Logos of all time, coming in at number nine.

In the late 1980s, with the emergence of streetwear fashion, Tommy Boy produced and distributed Carhartt jackets embroidered with its logo on the front and back for its own merchandise line called Tommy Boy Gear. Tommy Boy is also credited as the first to use lanyards as promotional items, which became a popular streetwear fashion accessory in the 1990s.

Selected artists

808 State
Above The Law
Afrika Bambaataa
Amari
 Amber
Big Noyd
Biz Markie (deceased)
Black by Demand
Bob Sinclar
Boiler Room
Capone-N-Noreaga
Christian Tiger School
The Cliks
Coldcut
Coolio (deceased)
De La Soul
Digital Underground
Disco D (deceased)
Everlast
Fannypack
Fresh Gordon
Force MDs
GLOBE & Whiz Kid
Ghostface Killah
Gucci Mane
Handsome Boy Modeling School
House of Pain
Indica
Indo G
Information Society
Jocelyn Enriquez
Jonzun Crew
Joydrop
Junior Vasquez
K7
Kim Burrell
Kristine W
LFO
Lord Finesse
J.C. Lodge
Masters at Work
Method Man
Money Mike
Naughty by Nature
Paris 
Pimpadelic
Planet Patrol
Plushgun
Prince Paul
Prince Rakeem
Queen Latifah
RuPaul
Shock G (deceased)
Sneaker Pimps
Soul Coughing
Stars on 54
Stetsasonic
Thunderpuss
Timmy Gatling
TKA
Tony Touch
Viewtiful Joe

Discography

References

External links
 
 Company reference in Hoover's

 
American record labels
House music record labels
1981 establishments in New York City
Record labels established in 1981
Hip hop record labels
Post-disco record labels
Warner Records